Harm Reduction International, formerly known as International Harm Reduction Association, describes itself as a non-governmental organisation (NGO) in Special Consultative Status with the United Nations Economic and Social Council, and works within harm reduction model in the field of harm reduction.  In 1990, the first International Harm Reduction conference was held in Liverpool, England. As Liverpool was one of the first cities in Britain to instigate harm reduction policies, including opening one of the first government-funded needle exchanges under the 'Mersey Harm Reduction Model', the first International Harm Reduction Conference attracted a diverse range of harm reduction proponents, including academics, community workers, medical professionals and drug user activists.

Following the success of the first International Harm Reduction Conference, an annual International Harm Reduction Conference was held in a different country each year. These annual international conferences were integral in promoting the principles of harm reduction, influencing local drug-related policies and building networks of harm reduction practitioners and drug user activists.

In 1997, the International Harm Reduction Association (IHRA) was launched at the 7th International Harm Reduction Conference in Hobart, Tasmania, Australia. The initial aims of IHRA were to enable networking and communication between conferences, and facilitate collective advocacy for health-based approaches to drug use and HIV; however, in 2006, IHRA expanded its activities beyond facilitating the annual harm reduction conference to include directly working on public health research, analysis and advocacy and began to undertake a more sustained approach to highlighting the human right violations experienced by illicit drug users in many parts of the world.

, there have been 22 international conferences held across the globe, which have become the primary international meeting and networking point for drug user activists and community-based organizations.

In 2011, the IHRA changed its name to Harm Reduction International.

Vision and mission
Harm Reduction International primarily engages in advocacy to reduce the harms resulting from policies relating to the use of illicit drugs. Through promoting evidenced-based public health policies and promoting a human rights-based best practice approach to drug policy reform, Harm Reduction International aims to achieve global social change in which individuals and communities benefit from drug laws, policies and practices that promote the health, dignity and human rights of illicit drug users.

Harm Reduction International's work includes supporting and undertaking research, analysis, advocacy and strengthening the capacity of civil society to engage in harm reduction and drug policy reform initiatives.

This idea of harm reduction has controversial topic. This argument of if it is morally ethically, gets brought to the public's attention.

The founding director was Pat O'Hare (1997-2004), followed by Prof Gerry Stimson (2004-2010) and then Rick Lines in 2010.

Awards 
Each year, Harm Reduction International presents a number of awards at international conference to acknowledge the contributions of outstanding groups or individuals in the field.

Rolleston Award 
The award is named after Sir Humphry Rolleston, President of the Royal College of Physicians who chaired the UK Departmental Committee on Morphine and Heroin Addiction. In 1926 this committee concluded that the prescription of heroin or morphine could be regarded as legitimate medical treatment for those in whom withdrawal produces serious symptoms that cannot be treated satisfactorily under normal practice and, for those for who are able to lead a useful and fairly normal life so long as they take a certain non-progressive quantity, usually small, of the drug of addiction, but cease to be able to do so when the regular allowance is withdrawn. This decision epitomises a benign, pragmatic and humane approach to drug problems, and was a landmark event in the history of harm reduction.

International Rolleston Award 
This award was first presented at the 3rd International Conference on the Reduction of Drug Related Harm in Melbourne in 1992. Each year, it is given to an individual who has made an outstanding contribution to reducing harms from psychoactive substances at an international level.

 1992 : Dave Purchase (United States)
 1993 : Ernest Drucker (United States)
 1994 : Alex Wodak (Australia)
 1995 : Anne Coppel (France)
 1996 : Aaron Peak (Nepal)
 1997 : Luigi Ciotti (Italia)
 1998 : Nick Crofts (Australia)
 1999 : Jean-Paul Grund (Netherlands)
 2000 : Pat O'Hare (United Kingdom)
 2001 : Fabio Mesquita (Brazil)
 2002 : Ethan Nadelmann (United States)
 2003 : Ambros Uchtenhagen (Switzerland)

 2004 : Anya Sarang (Russia)
 2005 : Zunyou Wu (China)
 2006 : Robert G. Newman (United States)
 2007 : Vladimir Mendelevich (Russia)
 2008 : Andrew Ball (Australia)
 2009 : Ralf Jurgens (Canada) et Sam Friedman (United States)
 2010 : Gerry Stimson (United Kingdom)
 2011 : Jude Byrne (Australia) et Needle Rich (United States)
 2013 :  Kasia Malinowska-Sempruch (Poland/USA) 
 2015 :  Edo Augustian Nasution (Indonesia)
 2017 : Péter Sárosi and István Gábor Takács (Hungary)
 2019 : Andrey Rylkov Foundation (Russia)

National Rolleston Award 
This award was first presented at the ‘3rd International Conference on the Reduction of Drug Related Harm’ in Melbourne in 1992. Each year, it is given to an individual or organisation for their outstanding contributions to reducing harm from psychoactive substances at the national level in the country that is hosting the harm reduction conference.

 1992 : Les Drew (Australia)
 1993 : Wijnand Mulder (Netherlands)
 1994 : Catherine Hankins (Canada)
 1995 : San Giuliano Milanese Unità de Strada (Italia)
 1996 : The Australian IV League (Australia)
 1997 : Alain Mucchielli (France)
 1998 : Tarcisio Andrade (Brazil)
 1999 : André Seidenberg (Switzerland)
 2000 : Michael Wavell (Jersey)
 2001 : Jimmy Dorabjee (India)
 2002 : Tatja Kostnapfel-Rihtar (Slovenia)
 2003 : Mae Chan District Project (Thailand)

 2004 : Anthony Trimingham (Australia)
 2005 : Des Flannagan (Northern Ireland)
 2006 : The Drug User Advisory Group (Canada)
 2007 : Marek Zygadlo (Poland)
 2008 : Àmbit Prevenció (Spain)
 2009 : Thai Drug Users’ Network (TDN) Founders (Thailand)
 2010 : Russell Newcombe (United Kingdom)
 2011 : Elie Aaraj (Lebanon)
 2015  : Malaysian AIDS Council (Malaysia)
 2017 : Vancouver Area Network of Drug Users (VANDU) (Canada)
 2019 : Consumidores Associados Sobrevivem Organizados (CASO) (Portugal)

Harm reduction model 
Harm reduction is a set of practical strategies and ideas aimed at reducing negative consequences associated with Mal-adaptive behaviors. Harm Reduction is also a movement for social justice built on a belief in, and respect for, the rights of people and compassionate pragmatism. Its focus is a shift from abstinence only approach towards preventive and safer approach. The focus of the attention is not the behavior itself, but the harm associated with it or the relative harmfulness. Harm Reduction Model developed in phases which started with health concerns in 1960's and the second phase in 1990's with sharp focus on AIDS prevention and lately in public health and human rights aspects.

Principles
 A non-judgmental approach that treats every person with dignity, compassion, and respect, regardless of circumstance or condition.
 Utilizing evidence-based, feasible, and cost-effective practices to prevent and reduce harm.
 Accepting behavior change as an incremental process in which individuals engage in self-discovery and transition through “stages of change.”
 Active and meaningful participation of persons in crisis and community stakeholders in shaping sensible policies and practices.
 Focusing on enhancing quality of life for individuals and communities, rather than promoting a cessation approach.
 Recognizing complex social factors that influence vulnerability to drug use and drug-related harm, including poverty, social inequality, discrimination, and trauma;
 Empowering the people at risk to be the primary agents in reducing the harms of their behavior pattern.
 Commitment to defending universal human rights.

Ideology
Harm reduction approach is not a passive strategy that is “done to” participants. Rather, it is an active and interactive process. To practice harm reduction, individuals must be engaged in “self-management so that they may be capable of anticipating risky situations and generating viable, preferred alternatives that are suited to the situation at hand and reflect their own considered goals.”
The Harm Reduction approach is one that can be tailored to diverse client populations and varying settings. The idea of beginning where the client is and learning where the individual would like to go is the framework of Harm Reduction and can be applied to approaching any number of social, health or behavioral issues. The Harm Reduction model, which is based on public health principles, takes a preventative stance to intervention with an aim to reduce the health, social, and economic harms associated with the unhealthy behaviors and considers the impact relative to the individual, family, and community. Harm Reduction strategies can be used with any individual engaging in any kind of potentially self-destructive behavior that they may be reluctant to stop. The nonjudgmental, non-stigmatizing approach regarding any number of presenting problems or behaviors may be enough motivation or engagement for the person at risk to return to the intervention. The ideology is based on ensuring the respect, quality of life of the individual and the community, and to protect fundamental human rights.

Intervention Process
The general approach advocates lessening the harms associated with the risky behaviors through education, prevention, management and treatment(for drug abuse only). The tailoring of harm reduction interventions to address the specific risks and harms also take into account other bio-psycho-social factors. The person who assists the person-at-risk acts as an advocate or guide and not as a healer or fixer.
Generic Stages of Harm Reduction model Intervention Process:-
 Establish Rapport.
 Motivational Interview and Psycho-education.
 Dealing with Emotions.
 Generate and Explore Prevention and Management Strategies.
 Implement Action Plan.(Assist)
 Relapse prevention & Follow-up.

Goals of Harm Reduction Model
Harm reduction is described as a pragmatic response to address risky behaviors. Harm reduction helps the person to move from a state of chaos to a state of control over their own life and health. The goals are Helping, Advocating, Reducing recidivism, Mending wounds, Reinforcing healthier options, Educating (accurately & w/permission), Delivering hope, Uncovering challenges, Celebrating choice, Treatment opportunities, Investing your time, Offering support & Never, ever giving up on a client! The client is an expert in his ailing, you are just a service provider.

Harm reduction model in a Community-based Approach
Public pressure is the core for any service delivery in a community. It is best to employ community mobilization tactics to make the community aware of the harm reduction strategy with joint collaboration of community partners and stakeholders. Because, people with credibility in the community can be strong champions of this work and ensures legitimacy. Every effort should also be made to include individuals with past-present personal experience of problematic behaviors. It is also helpful to have representation from health, social services, education and law enforcement.
For effective implementation:-
 Inform and listen to the community
 Reduce barriers to acceptance of harm reduction
 Overcome denial of community concerns and issues
 Ensure each point of view is listened to with respect
 Promote local ownership of the project
 Develop collaboration between individuals and organizations
Public information events and Open meetings are particularly helpful when dealing with a controversial issue in harm reduction. It increases awareness of the issues and increases community support for the harm reduction strategy. They provide opportunities to share objective, credible information and address misconceptions. The community may be undecided on the issues, but will likely give serious consideration to a strategy that has good evidence and desirable objectives.

Application
The Harm Reduction model, with its foundation in public health principles, will be an important component in the future of treatment in tackling various unhealthy behaviors in society. It is an humanistic approach to the recovery of the society and the individuals involved. Harm reduction practice and model encourages open dialogue, consultation and debate. It allows a wide range of stakeholders to be a part of policy development and programme implementation, delivery and evaluation. Universally as the entire altruistic care system moves towards, harm reduction model will enable it to perceive more awareness of management and preventative care.

References

External links
 

Medical and health organisations based in London